Karvansara (also Romanized as Kārvānsarā) is a village in Anguran Rural District, Anguran District, Mahneshan County, Zanjan Province, Iran. At the 2006 census, its population was 140, in 23 families.

References 

Populated places in Mahneshan County